"I Want to Live" is a song by the Christian rock band Skillet, released as a promotional single off of their ninth album, Unleashed.

About the song 
John Cooper decided to write "I Want to Live" while wandering the streets of Moscow after a concert in Russia where a fan had given the group a letter in which she talked about suffering from depression. She was laughed at in school and she even thought about suicide, but Skillet's music made her want to live. Cooper was impressed with the "I want to live" line.

Charts

Song credits 
 John Cooper — lead vocals, bass
 Korey Cooper — rhythm guitar, keyboards
 Jen Ledger — drums, backing vocals
 Seth Morrison — lead guitar

References 

Skillet (band) songs
2016 songs
Songs written by John Cooper (musician)
2016 singles
Atlantic Records singles
Symphonic metal songs